The 1954 Houston Cougars football team was an American football team that represented the University of Houston in the Missouri Valley Conference (MVC) during the 1954 college football season. In its seventh and final season under head coach Clyde Lee, the team compiled a 5–5 record (3–1 against conference opponents) and finished in second place out of five teams in the MVC. George Patterson and George Hynes were the team captains. The team played its home games at Rice Stadium in Houston.

Schedule

References

Houston
Houston Cougars football seasons
Houston Cougars football